Keaton Prescott, known artistically as Sullivan King, is an American DJ and heavy metal musician. He has drawn attention from the music press for his unusual blending of EDM and electric guitar-centered heavy metal performance, "making his live shows one of the few places where kandi-coated ravers and metalheads mingle". King has made multiple US tours since his concert debut in 2014, most recently announcing a nationwide tour during the latter half of 2021, and has released singles collaborating with musicians including Papa Roach and drummer Matt McGuire of The Chainsmokers.

Discography

Studio albums

Extended plays

Singles
 "Kill it with Fire" (with Ghastly) (2014)
 "Breathe" (featuring Amber Noel) (2015)
 "Vantablack" (with Dirtyphonics) (2017)
 "Welcome to the Fire" (with Slander) (2017)
 "I'll Fight Back" (2018)
 "Go Down" (with Yookie) (2018)
 "Between the Lines" (with Kai Wachi) (2019)
 "Crazy as You" (with Grabbitz) (2019)
 "Save the World" (2019)
 "Don't Forget Me" (with Wooli) (2020)
 "Flatline" (with Kai Wachi and GG Magree) (2020)
 "Someone Else" (2020)
 "Unbound" (with Excision) (2021)
 "Domination" (with Kayzo and Papa Roach) (2021)
 "Take Flight" (with Subtronics) (2021)
 "Sleep" (with Calcium) (2022)
 "The Dead March" (with Ray Volpe) (2022)
 "Let Me Go" (with Wooli) (2022)
 "Thrones of Blood" (2023)

As featured artist
 "Break it Down" (JayKode featuring Sullivan King) (2017)
 "Wicked" (Bear Grillz featuring Sullivan King) (2018)
 "Shake the Ground" (Kill the Noise and Snails featuring Sullivan King and Jonah Kay) (2018)

References

Living people
American electronic musicians
American rock musicians
Monstercat artists
Dim Mak Records artists
Hopeless Records artists
Ultra Records artists
Reprise Records artists
Rise Records artists
RCA Records artists
Geffen Records artists
Interscope Records artists
Date of birth missing (living people)
Year of birth missing (living people)